The 2000 NCAA Women's Division I Swimming and Diving Championships were contested at the 19th annual NCAA-sanctioned swim meet to determine the team and individual national champions of Division I women's collegiate swimming and diving in the United States. 

This year's events were hosted at the Indiana University Natatorium in Indianapolis, Indiana. 

Georgia again finished atop the team standings, 18.5 points ahead of Arizona; it was the Bulldogs' second consecutive and second overall women's team title.

Team standings
Note: Top 10 only
(DC) = Defending champions
Full results

See also
List of college swimming and diving teams

References

NCAA Division I Swimming And Diving Championships
NCAA Division I Swimming And Diving Championships
NCAA Division I Women's Swimming and Diving Championships